Jesse Rutherford may refer to:
Jesse Rutherford Jr. (1923–1942), American marine awarded the Navy Cross
Jesse Rutherford (singer) (born 1991), American actor and musician, lead singer of The Neighborhood
USS Jesse Rutherford, a United States Navy destroyer, named for Jesse Rutherford Jr.